is a Japanese footballer currently playing as a defender for FC Osaka.

Career
Itakura started his youth career with Omiya Meteor, and played at Yokohama F. Marinos until 2016, when he entered Toyo University on 2017, being graduated in 2020.

After he his graduation, Itakura began his professional career with Vanraure Hachinohe, starting from the 2021 season. He is often mistaken for Ko Itakura, but they are not related.

On 29 December 2022, Itakura officially transferred to newly promoted J3 club FC Osaka, for the upcoming 2023 season.

Career statistics

Club
.

Notes

References

External links

1998 births
Living people
Sportspeople from Saitama (city)
Association football people from Saitama Prefecture
Toyo University alumni
Japanese footballers
Association football defenders
J3 League players
Yokohama F. Marinos players
Vanraure Hachinohe players
FC Osaka players